Mercury nitrate can refer to:
Mercury(I) nitrate, Hg2(NO3)2
Mercury(II) nitrate, Hg(NO3)2